Giovanni Pellielo (born 11 January 1970) is an Italian sport shooter. He won the silver medal in Men's trap at the 2008 Summer Olympics, and also earned a bronze medal in the 2000 Summer Olympics in Sydney and a silver medal in the 2004 Summer Olympics in Athens and 2016 Rio Olympics.

Biography
Giovanni Pellielo is trained by the Olympic champion and technical commissioner of the Italian national team Albano Pera. He won ten stages of the World Cup and fifteen medals at the World Cup Final from 1992 to 2015.

Since 2016, Pellielo has been an ordained bishop in the liberal Catholic Holy Celtic Church International.

Medals

Olympic Games

World Championships
Pellielo won 25 medal, 9 individual and 16 in team events, at the World Shooting Championships.

World Cup
The Shotgun World Cup took place in 5 stages + the World Cup Finals up to 1997, since 1998 it takes place in 4 stages + the World Cup Finals.

European Championships
Pellielo won his first medal at senior level at the European Shooting Championships in 1991, at the age of 21,  in the edition held in Casalecchio di Reno near Bologna.

Records

See also
Multi-participation men in shooting at the Olympic Games
Italy at the Olympics – Athletes with most appearances
World Cup Multi-Medalists
Trap World Champions

References

External links
 

1970 births
Living people
Trap and double trap shooters
Italian male sport shooters
World record holders in shooting
Olympic shooters of Italy
Shooters at the 1992 Summer Olympics
Shooters at the 1996 Summer Olympics
Shooters at the 2000 Summer Olympics
Shooters at the 2004 Summer Olympics
Shooters at the 2008 Summer Olympics
Shooters at the 2012 Summer Olympics
Shooters at the 2016 Summer Olympics
Olympic silver medalists for Italy
Olympic bronze medalists for Italy
Olympic medalists in shooting
Medalists at the 2016 Summer Olympics
Medalists at the 2008 Summer Olympics
Medalists at the 2004 Summer Olympics
Medalists at the 2000 Summer Olympics
Shooters at the 2019 European Games
Shooters at the 2015 European Games
European Games silver medalists for Italy
European Games bronze medalists for Italy
European Games medalists in shooting
Mediterranean Games medalists in shooting
Mediterranean Games gold medalists for Italy
Mediterranean Games silver medalists for Italy
Mediterranean Games bronze medalists for Italy
Competitors at the 1997 Mediterranean Games
Competitors at the 2005 Mediterranean Games
Competitors at the 2009 Mediterranean Games
Competitors at the 2013 Mediterranean Games
Competitors at the 2018 Mediterranean Games
People from Vercelli
Shooters of Fiamme Azzurre
Sportspeople from the Province of Vercelli